LA 18 may refer to:
  KSCI (also known as KSCI-TV and LA-18) Los Angeles TV station
 Louisiana Highway 18
 18th Street gang, a transnational criminal gang